The 2018 Melon Music Awards ceremony, organized by Kakao M (a kakao company) through its online music store, Melon, took place on December 1, 2018 at the Gocheok Sky Dome in Seoul, South Korea. This was the tenth ceremony in the show's history.

Wanna One, iKon and BTS took home the grand prizes, also known as the "Daesang Awards".

Judging criteria

Performers and presenters

The following individuals and groups, listed in order of appearance, presented awards or performed musical numbers.

Performers

Presenters

Winners and nominees 
Only artists who released music between December 2, 2017 and October 25, 2018 were eligible, and the nominees were selected by calculating the number of downloads, streams, and weekly Melon Popularity Award votes achieved by each artist.

Winners are listed first and highlighted in boldface. Voting for Top 10 Artists took place on the Melon Music website from October 26 through November 13, 2018. Voting for Category awards took place from November 14 through November 30, 2018.

Voted Awards

Other awards

References

External links

2018 music awards
Melon Music Awards ceremonies
Annual events in South Korea